Glymont is an unincorporated community in Charles County, Maryland, United States.

Geography
Glymont is located at  (38.6012297, -77.1438678).

Nearby cities
Perry Wright 0.5 mi. SW
Potomac Heights 0.5 mi. N
Indian Head 1 mi. W
Occoquan (Prince William County, Virginia) 8.5 mi. NW
Port Tobacco 9.1 mi. SE
Quantico (Prince William County, Virginia) 9.8 mi. SW

Nearby cemeteries
Saint Charles 0.5 mi. E
Park Hill 1.8 mi. SW
Marbury 2.3 mi. S
Pleasant Grove 3.2 mi. SW
Saint Johns 3.6 mi. E
Metropolitan 3.8 mi. E
Pisgah 4.2 mi. S
Macedonia 4.8 mi. NE
Smith Chapel 5 mi. S
Shiloh 5.2 mi. NE
Alexandria 5.4 mi. SW
Fairfax Grave (Fairfax County, Virginia) 5.5 mi. N

References

External links
Histopolis Place ID: 704869828

Unincorporated communities in Charles County, Maryland
Unincorporated communities in Maryland